Makhmud Alisultanovich Esambayev (15 July 1924 – 7 January 2000) was a Soviet and Chechen dancer, ballet master, choreographer and actor. Makhmud was regarded as one of the most famous dancers of the Soviet Union. People's Artist of the USSR (1974) and Hero of Socialist Labour (1984).

Biography
Makhmud was born in Starye Atagi, USSR to a Chechen family. When he was a child, his father would take him to village weddings where he would perform dances. At the age of fifteen, Makhmud joined the Checheno-Ingush Song and Dance Company, and at nineteen, he joined the operetta theater of Pyatigorsk, where he would give concerts to Red Army troops fighting in World War II.

In 1944, he was deported along with other Chechen people during the Deportation of the Chechens and Ingush, an ethnic cleansing of Chechen and Ingush people by the Soviet forces.

Years later, Makhmud joined the Kyrgyz theater of opera and ballet as a soloist, where he played the lead role in productions of Swan Lake (playing the part of Von Rothbart), The Fountain of Bakhchisarai and The Sleeping Beauty.

After the rehabilitation of the Chechen people and gaining the right of return, Makhmud was elected more than once to the Supreme Soviet of the Checheno-Ingush ASSR, the Russian SFSR, and the Soviet Union.

Makhmud was known for always wearing his papakha hat, calling it "my crown" and not even removing it when meeting with a head of state. His papakha made an unparalleled and very conspicuous presence on the floor of the Soviet legislature. On noticing it, the Soviet leader Leonid Brezhnev would murmur that "Makhmud is here, it's time to call the session open."

He died of natural causes on 7 January 2000.

He was a recipient of the Hero of Socialist Labour and People's Artist of the USSR awards.

Honours and awards
 Hero of Socialist Labour (13 July 1984) - for outstanding contributions to the development of Soviet choreography
 Order "For Merit to the Fatherland", 3rd class (15 July 1999) - for outstanding contribution to the art of dance
 Order of Friendship (20 July 1994) - for outstanding achievement in the arts of dance and productive social activities
 Order of the Patriotic War, 2nd class (11 March 1985)
Honored Artist of the RSFSR (1957)
 People's Artist of the RSFSR (1966)
 People's Artist of the USSR (1974)
 A minor planet, 4195 Esambaev, is named after him
 The former "Central street" in Starye Atagi was renamed after Esambayev in 2011.
 Nairamdal Medal of the Mongolian People's Republic (1977)

|-
! colspan="3" style="background: red;" | Ovation
|-

|-

Filmography
I Will Dance (1963)
Swan Lake (1968)
The Land of Sannikov (1973)
Upright Magic (1975)
At the World's Limit International (1974)
Upright Magic (1975)
Rip (1994)

See also
 List of dancers

References

External links
Chechnya Free.ru Article on Makhmud Esambayev

Kinox.ru Biographical Data

1924 births
2000 deaths
20th-century Russian ballet dancers
20th-century Russian male actors
People from Groznensky District
Tenth convocation members of the Supreme Soviet of the Soviet Union
Eleventh convocation members of the Supreme Soviet of the Soviet Union
Chechen dances
Chechen people
Heroes of Socialist Labour
Honored Artists of the RSFSR
People's Artists of the RSFSR
People's Artists of the USSR
Recipients of the Order "For Merit to the Fatherland", 3rd class
Recipients of the Order of Lenin
Recipients of the Order of the Red Banner of Labour
Russian people of Chechen descent
Kyrgyzstani ballet dancers
Russian choreographers
Russian male actors
Russian male ballet dancers
Russian male dancers
Soviet choreographers
Soviet male actors
Soviet male ballet dancers
Soviet male dancers